The 2017–18 VfB Stuttgart season is the 125th season in the football club's history and 52nd overall season in the top flight of German football, the Bundesliga, having been promoted from the 2. Bundesliga in 2017. In addition to the domestic league, VfB Stuttgart also are participating in this season's edition of the domestic cup, the DFB-Pokal. This is the 85th season for Stuttgart in the Mercedes-Benz Arena, located in Stuttgart, Baden-Württemberg, Germany. The season covers a period from 1 July 2017 to 30 June 2018.

Players

Squad information

Transfers

In

Out

Competitions

Overview

Bundesliga

League table

Results summary

Results by round

Matches

DFB-Pokal

References

VfB Stuttgart seasons
Stuttgart, VfB